Shorkot Cantonment is a cantonment area adjacent to PAF Base Rafiqui,  in east from Shorkot city in Jhang district of Punjab province of Pakistan.

It is famous for Pakistan Air Force Base 'Rafiqui'.

Shorkot Cantonment Junction railway station is located in this cantonment area.

References

Cantonments of Pakistan
Jhang District